Visoki Kurji vrh (1822 m), also just Visoki vrh is a peak in the Western Karawanks in Slovenia.

References

External links 
 Visoki Kurji vrh on Geopedia

Mountains of Upper Carniola
Karawanks
One-thousanders of Slovenia
Mountains of the Alps